The enzyme S-succinylglutathione hydrolase (EC 3.1.2.13) catalyzes the reaction 

S-succinylglutathione + H2O  glutathione + succinate

This enzyme belongs to the family of hydrolases, specifically those acting on thioester bonds.  The systematic name is ''S''-succinylglutathione hydrolase.

References 

 
 

EC 3.1.2
Enzymes of unknown structure